Angels Wear White is a 2017 Chinese drama film directed by Vivian Qu. It was screened in the main competition section of the 74th Venice International Film Festival.

Plot
Mia (Vicky Chen), a teenager, works as a cleaner in a motel in a small seaside town. One night, while manning the reception for her co-worker Lili (Peng Jing), she witnesses the sexual assault of two 12-year-old schoolgirls by a middle-aged man. Through the surveillance TV, she sees the man forcing himself into the girls' room and records the whole incident with her mobile phone.

Cast
 Vicky Chen as Mia (Xiaomi) 
 Zhou Meijun as Xiaowen
 Shi Ke as Attorney Hao
 Liu Weiwei as Xiaowen's mother
 Geng Le as Xiaowen's father
 Jiang Xinyue as Zhang Xinxin 
 Peng Jing as Lili
 Wang Yuexin
 Li Mengnan
 Bamboo Chen

Release
It opened the 28th Singapore International Film Festival (SGIFF) on 23 November 2017 at Marina Bay Sands, Singapore.

Awards and nominations

References

External links
 

2017 films
2017 drama films
Chinese drama films
2010s Mandarin-language films